The tignon law (also known as the chignon law) was a 1786 law enacted by the Spanish Governor of Louisiana Esteban Rodríguez Miró that forced black women to wear a tignon headscarf. The law was intended to halt plaçage unions and tie freed black women to those who were enslaved, but the women who followed the law have been described as turning the headdress into a "mark of distinction".

Background 
The Code Noir, or black code, was a French law that restricted the lives of people of color living in French colonies. It had first been created to apply in the Caribbean colonies in 1685, but was extended to Louisiana in 1724. Spanish authorities instituted a similar law, first in 1769 and again in 1778. By 1786, Esteban Rodríguez Miró was the Spanish governor of Louisiana. He disliked actions some black women had taken, considering them to show "too much luxury in their bearing." White women began to urge Miró to act to restrict the fashion of non-whites.

Law 
Miró added an item to a decree that he was already going to issue. The June 2, 1786, decree, formally titled the bando de buen gobierno or "proclamation of good government", stated that women of color had to wear a scarf or handkerchief over their hair as a visible sign of belonging to the slave class, whether they were enslaved or not; specifying that "the Negras Mulatas, y quarteronas can no longer have feathers nor jewelry in their hair. [... instead, they] must wear [their hair] plain (Ilanos) or wear panuelos, if they are of higher status, as they have been accustomed to."

Effect 
During the 18th century, laws restricting what black people could wear were not uncommon. Miró hoped that the law would halt plaçage unions and tie freed black women to those who were enslaved. While white women in New Orleans  initially stopped wearing their hair in the style, Empress Joséphine of France eventually adopted the headpiece, and it became considered haute couture in the early 19th century before decreasing in popularity in the 1830s.

Virginia Gould writes that the true purpose of the law was to control women "who had become too light skinned or who dressed too elegantly, or who, in reality competed too freely with white women for status and thus threatened the social order." She also notes that there is no evidence it was ever enforced and the women who followed the law turned the headdress into a "mark of distinction".

In popular culture
Publications such as Essence and Vice have discussed the law and its effects.

See also
Sumptuary law

References 

1786 in law
1786 in North America
Louisiana (New Spain)
Clothing controversies
Anti-black racism in North America
19th-century fashion